The Middleburg United Methodist Church, formerly known as the Methodist Episcopal Church at Black Creek,  is an historic church in Middleburg, Florida. On March 9, 1990, it was added to the U.S. National Register of Historic Places.

Current functions
Part of the Florida Annual Conference of the United Methodist Church, Middleburg UMC is still growing to this day with a new contemporary worship service (with full Praise Band), a sister church in Mayorkin, Cuba and a new Family Life Center. Lighthouse Christian School (of Jacksonville, FL) now utilizes the Family Life Center on weekdays as their newest K-12 school campus.

See also
 National Register of Historic Places listings in Florida

References

External links

 Florida's Office of Cultural and Historical Programs
 Clay County listings
 Middleburg United Methodist Church

United Methodist churches in Florida
National Register of Historic Places in Clay County, Florida
Churches on the National Register of Historic Places in Florida
Cemeteries in Florida
Carpenter Gothic church buildings in Florida
Churches in Clay County, Florida